Christopher James Taylor (born 30 October 1985) was a professional Association Football player for Swindon Town. He currently plays for Swindon Supermarine after a spell in Australia and two other English teams.

References

External links 
 

1985 births
Living people
Swindon Town F.C. players
Association football midfielders
English footballers